This is a list of owners and executives of the Tampa Bay Rays of Major League Baseball.

Owners

General Managers

Other executives
Brian Auld
Rocco Baldelli
Eddie Bane
Cam Bonifay
R. J. Harrison
Gerry Hunsicker
Fred McGriff
Rick Williams

References

External links
Baseball America: Executive Database

 
 
Tampa Bay
Owners and executives